Murrell Dobbins Career & Technical Education High School, also known as Murrell Dobbins Vocational High School, is a historic vocational school building located in the West Lehigh neighborhood of North Philadelphia, Pennsylvania, United States. It is part of the School District of Philadelphia. The building was designed by Irwin T. Catharine and built between 1936–1937.  It is a six- to seven-story, 14-bay, brick building in the Moderne-style. It has a one-story, stone front building.  It features brick piers with terracotta tops and the building has terra cotta trim.

The school is the home of the Mustangs and the school colors are Flame and Steel.  Murrell Dobbins offers 12 CTE programs: Barbering, Biotechnology, Building & Property Maintenance, Business Administration, Commercial & Advertising Arts, Computer Networking, Cosmetology, Culinary Arts, Digital Media, Fashion Design, Graphic Design, Music Production. Dobbins athletics consist of Football, Cross-Country, Volleyball, Soccer, Basketball, Indoor Track, Bowling, Cheerleading, Badminton, Baseball, Softball and Outdoor Track.

History
The Dobbins building was added to the National Register of Historic Places in 1988.

The namesake, Murrell H. Dobbins (1843-1917), was a New Jersey-born man who became a member of the Philadelphia school board.

At one point the school had two campuses and was known as the Dobbins/Randolph Area Vocational Technical School. It had absorbed the Randolph Skills Center, named after Asa Philip Randolph.

Notable alumni
 Benjamin Britt, surrealist painter
 Hank Gathers, college basketball player
 Gregory "Bo" Kimble, NBA player
 Dawn Staley, head coach of women's basketball at University of South Carolina; 3-time Olympian
 Doug Overton, retired professional basketball player and current head coach of the Springfield Armor of the NBA Development League
 Jami M. Valentine, Ph.D., physicist, first African American woman to earn a Ph.D. in physics from Johns Hopkins University; Dobbins class of 1992
 Bobby Eli, Philly Soul guitarist, songwriter, producer, arranger; founding member of MFSB
 Thom Bell, Philly Soul songwriter, producer and arranger

External links

Murrell Dobbins Career and Technical Education High School

References

School buildings on the National Register of Historic Places in Philadelphia
Moderne architecture in Pennsylvania
School buildings completed in 1937
Dobbins, Murrell, Vocational School
Dobbins, Murrell, Vocational School
Dobbins, Murrell, Vocational School
Dobbins, Murrell, Vocational School
School District of Philadelphia
Public high schools in Pennsylvania
1937 establishments in Pennsylvania